Ex Auditu is a theological journal. It consists of a collection of papers, initially from the Frederick Neumann Symposium on Theological Interpretation of Scripture at Princeton Theological Seminary and later from the North Park Symposium on the Theological Interpretation of Scripture.

It was established as an alternative to the Journal of Biblical Literature, and focuses on the theological interpretation of Scripture.

References

Protestant studies journals
Biblical studies journals
Publications established in 1985
English-language journals
1985 establishments in New Jersey